Francisco Mosquera (born 5 November 1973) is a Colombian footballer. He played in two matches for the Colombia national football team from 1996 to 1997. He was also part of Venezuela's squad for the 1997 Copa América tournament.

References

External links
 

1973 births
Living people
Colombian footballers
Colombia international footballers
Association football defenders
Sportspeople from Medellín